Bali Rai (born 30 November 1971) is an English author of children's and young adult fiction.

Early life
Rai was born in Leicester in 1971, to Punjabi parents. At the age of eleven, he read The Secret Diary of Adrian Mole by Sue Townsend, which inspired him to take up writing. He has also cited Roald Dahl as an early influence on his writing. He attended Judgemeadow Community College, moving to Wyggeston and Queen Elizabeth I College for sixth form.

In 1991, Rai moved to London to study at Southbank University, graduating with a 2:1 in Politics. He stayed in London for two years after graduating, but was forced to return to Leicester due to personal circumstances. He had a number of jobs, including working for a supermarket, in telesales, and managing a bar. He began to write his first novel, (Un)arranged Marriage, during this period.

Writing career
Bali Rai showed parts of his debut novel, (Un)arranged Marriage, to literary agent Jennifer Luithlen, who agreed to represent him. Once the novel had been edited, Rai signed a contract with Transworld. The novel was published in 2001 to critical acclaim.

Rani & Sukh, which Rai described as a "true mash-up of Shakespeare, Bollywood and Punjabi folk tales", was published in 2004 and later became a GCSE set-text. He has also written several books for dyslexia-friendly publisher Barrington Stoke, such as Dream On and its sequel Game On. His work has been published in various anthologies, including the 2017 book Here I Stand, raising money and awareness for the human rights charity Amnesty International.

Rai has made appearances on television and radio to discuss racism, his writing, and promoting reading for pleasure. He has also been an ambassador for The Reading Agency's Reading Ahead programme, and was BookTrust's sixth online writer-in-residence. In 2019 he became an Ambassador for audiobook charity Listening Books.

In 2014, Rai received an honorary doctorate from De Montfort University in Leicester.

Awards

Works
 (Un)arranged Marriage (2001)
 The Crew (2003)
 What's Your Problem? (2003)
 Rani and Sukh (2004)
 The Whisper (2005)
 Dominoes and Other Stories (2005)
 The Last Taboo (2006)
 The Angel Collector (2007)
 City of Ghosts (2009)
 Killing Honour (2011)
 The Guru and The King (2012)
 Fire City (2012)
 Demon Hunter (2012)
 The Night Run (2014)
 Kiss of Death (2014)
 Web of Darkness (2014)
 Tales from India (2017)

Soccer Squad series
 Starting Eleven (2008)
 Missing! (2008)
 Stars! (2008)
 Glory! (2008)

Tales from Devana High series
 Concrete Chips (2004)
 Sold as Seen (2005)
 Jugglin'  (2006)
 Trouble (2013)
 Secrets (2013)

Barrington Stoke
 Dream On (2002)
 Two Timer (2005)
 Revenge of the Number Two (2007)
 Are You Kidding? (2008)
 Them and Us (2009)
 The Gun (2011)
 Shivers (2013)
 Old Dog, New Tricks (2014)
 Game On (2015), sequel to Dream On
 The Harder They Fall (2017)

Non-fiction
 Politics: Cutting Through the Crap (2006)

Contributor
Bali Rai has contributed short stories to a number of anthologies, including:
 Thirteen (2005)
 Losing It, edited by Keith Gray (2010)
 How to be a Boy, edited by Tony Bradman (2011)
 The Library Book (2012)
 Love Hurts, edited by Malorie Blackman (2015)
 Here I Stand, by Amnesty International (2017)

References

External links
Official website
Agent's website

1971 births
English children's writers
Living people
Alumni of London South Bank University